Pier Luigi de Borgia, 1st Duke of Gandía (1458 or 1460–1488 or 1491) was a Valencian noble. Pier Luigi was the son of Cardinal Rodrigo Borgia (later Pope Alexander VI), and an unknown free-woman (de tune Diacono Cardinali et soluta). He was half-brother of, among others, Isabella Borgia and Girolama Borgia, born by unknown mothers, and Cesare Borgia, Giovanni Borgia, Lucrezia Borgia and Goffredo Borgia, all born by Vannozza Cattanei.

He was promised to María Enríquez de Luna of the House of Enríquez. Due to Pier Luigi's untimely death, she would later wed his younger brother Giovanni (also known as Juan) in September 1493.

Pier Luigi Borgia fought alongside the Spanish armies during the Granada War (Reconquista). Following his heroic triumph during the Battle of Ronda, King Ferdinand II rewarded him with the title of 'grandee of Spain' on 18 May 1485.

The lands of Gandia, the ancestral home of the Borgia family, were initially inherited by Pier Luigi (Pedro Luis). However, before becoming duke of Gandía, he purchased the duchy through a financial agreement with local nobles Andrés de Cabrera, Marquis of Moya, and his wife, Beatriz de Bobadilla. Through this agreement, Pier Luigi was required to provide the marquis an unknown sum, albeit considered small, and accept certain rights pertaining to the crown and of Valencia over the lands of the duchy. Some sources state that Pedro Luis' father gave him 50,000 ducats in order to purchase the territory. In late 1485, King Ferdinand II officially elevated Pier Luigi's status to duke of Gandía. 

In his will, Pier Luigi ceded the duchy to his younger brother Giovanni and demanded a dowry of 10,000 florins to be given to his sister, Lucrezia.

See also 
 House of Borgia
 Route of the Borgias

References 

1458 births
1491 deaths
Pier Luigi
15th-century Italian nobility
Illegitimate children of Pope Alexander VI
201
Grandees of Spain